Dole Whip (also known as Dole Soft Serve) is a soft serve dairy-free frozen dessert created by Dole Food Company in 1984. Prior to 2023 when Dole Whip began to be sold at retailers, Dole Whip was served at Disney theme parks and Dole Soft Serve was sold elsewhere. The original pineapple flavor is the best known, and additional fruit flavors are sold.

Description
Dole Whip or Dole Soft Serve is a soft serve dairy-free frozen dessert. Disneyland and Walt Disney World serve Dole Whip by itself, or with Dole pineapple juice, called a Dole Whip float. Other retailers offer Dole Soft Serve. The original pineapple flavor is the best known. Additional fruit flavors are sold, including cherry, mango, lemon, watermelon, orange, raspberry, strawberry, and lime. For adults visiting the Disneyland and Walt Disney World parks, there is a Rum version of the Dole Whip.

Ingredients 
The Dole Whip is made with powder and water in a soft serve machine, though Disney published a recipe in 2020 to allow people to create their own Dole Whips at home during the COVID-19 pandemic. Since at least 2013, Dole Whip has been made with exclusively vegan ingredients, and it has always been gluten-free.

Calories 
According to MyFitnessPal and the Dole Soft Serve company, one serving equivalent to 2/3 cup of the Dole Whip has 110 calories.

History
Dole Whip was created by Dole Food Company in 1984. It was introduced at the National Restaurant Association show in May 1984, 10 years after Dole Food Company took over from United Airlines as the sponsor of Walt Disney's Enchanted Tiki Room (an attraction inside the Adventureland section of Disneyland). Dole Whip built on the attraction's initial refreshment offering of pineapple juice & fruit spears.

In December 2018, Disneyland opened the Tropical Hideaway, which offers a seating and dining area for Adventureland. With more soft serve machines they were able to offer more Dole Whip flavors and combinations, like Mango with a fruit medley with Tajín seasoning powder and Chamoy syrup and Raspberry Pineapple swirl with Hibiscus and fruit.

In 2023, Dole Whip was announced to be available in retail stores.

Cultural impact 
Dole Whip has achieved a cult following among Disney park-goers, allowing merchandise to be created in the Disney Snacks Merchandise category.

See also
 List of frozen dessert brands

References

External links 

Brand name frozen desserts
Disneyland
Dole plc
Walt Disney World